Pacific La Amistad Conservation Area (ACLA-P) is an administrative area which is managed by SINAC for the purposes of conservation in the southern part of Costa Rica, on the Pacific side of the Continental Divide. It contains several National Parks, and a number Wildlife refuges and other types of nature reserve.

Protected areas
 La Amistad International Park (shared with Panama and Caribbean La Amistad Conservation Area) 
 Chirripó National Park
 Las Tablas Protected Zone
 Los Santos Forest Reserve (shared with Central Conservation Area)
 Paraguas Lake Lacustrine Wetland
 San Vito Wetland

Conservation Areas of Costa Rica